Prospero or Prospero Mountain is a prominent peak in the Mount Royal Range in New South Wales, Australia.
The peak is marked by a Trig station, which was severely damaged in a storm in 2015.

References

Mountains of New South Wales